Cary Holladay is an American writer and professor, best known for her historical short fiction. In 1999, her story "Merry-Go-Sorry" about the West Memphis Three murder case was selected by Stephen King for an O. Henry Award.

Biography
Originally from Virginia, Holladay graduated from the College of William and Mary with a B.A. and then went on to earn an M.A. from Pennsylvania State University.

She is the author of a novel, Mercury; a novella, A Fight in the Doctor's Office; and six collections of short fiction. She taught in the MFA program at the University of Memphis, with her husband, the poet John Bensko, and retired in 2020; her honors held there included a First Tennessee Professor Award.

Her stories have appeared in over sixty literary journals and anthologies, including New Stories from the South and The Oxford American.

Works
 Brides in the Sky: Stories and a Novella, Swallow Press/Ohio UP, 2019
 The Deer in the Mirror, Ohio State UP, 2013 (Winner of the 2012 Ohio State University Prize in Short Fiction)
 Horse People: Stories, Louisiana State UP, 2013
 A Fight in the Doctor’s Office, Miami UP, 2008 (Winner of the 2007 Miami University Press Novella Contest)
 The Quick-Change Artist: Stories, Swallow Press / Ohio UP, 2006
 Mercury, a novel, Shaye Areheart Books / Random House, 2002
 The Palace of Wasted Footsteps, U of Missouri Press, 1998
 The People Down South, U of Illinois Press, 1989

References

External links
 Author page at the National Endowment for the Arts
 On Writing, from Glimmer Train
 Short story: "Land of Lightning", Superstition Review
 Interview with Breakwater Review

American short story writers
Living people
University of Memphis faculty
College of William & Mary alumni
Pennsylvania State University alumni
Year of birth missing (living people)